Princess Hwapyeong (5 June 1727 – 8 July 1748) was the eldest daughter of King Yeongjo of Joseon and Royal Noble Consort Yeong of the Jeonui Lee clan.

Biography
Her personal name is unknown. She was born to Royal Noble Consort Yeong of the Jeonui Yi clan on April 27, 1727, in Jippok Hall (집복헌, 集福軒), Changgyeong Palace (창경궁, 昌慶宮).

In 1731, she received the title Hwapyeong (和平), which means "peace".

In 1738, the 14th year of King Yeongjo's reign, she married Park Myeong-won (1725 – 1790; 박명원, 朴明源), fourth son of Park Sa-jeong (1683 – 1739; 박사정, 朴師正), from the Bannam Park clan (반남 박씨, 潘南朴氏). On February 20, 1742, she left the palace and moved to her in-law's residence.

Princess Hwapyeong's wedding was extremely grand, and her dowry was allegedly ten thousand times more extravagant than that of her elder sister, Princess Hwasun's. As a wedding gift, the King bestowed upon her the Ihyeon Palace, but she declined the gift. 

She did not conceive any children, but King Yeongjo made the third son of Park Myeong-won's eldest brother the adopted son of Princess Hwapyeong. 

In her memoirs, Princess Hwapyeong's sister-in-law, Lady Hyegyeong, described the Princess as being gentle and particularly kind towards her and Crown Prince Sado.

The Princess was uncomfortable and distressed by the fact that she alone was showered with paternal affection and that her younger brother, Crown Prince Sado, was not. Whenever King Yeongjo found fault in Sado, Princess Hwapyeong would side with her brother and pleaded ceaselessly with the King to be lenient. She was the main protector of Crown Prince Sado and is said to have eased the relationship between her father and the Prince in favor of her brother. 

Princess Hwapyeong died on June 24, 1748. Her father King Yeongjo hastily visited her residence and was informed that nothing could be done.  The King was devastated and inconsolable. He suspended all court affairs to mourn for her and even moved his residence from Gyeonghui Palace (慶熙宮) to Changdeok Palace (昌德宫), in order to be near the location of  the funerary observance. He visited her residence frequently and broke down on five occasions before Princess Hwapyeong's burial. King Yeongjo made great efforts in seizing the most auspicious location for the burial ground of his daughter. He forcefully acquired a piece of ancestral land owned by the Paju Yun family, who had been staying there for generations, and evacuated hundreds of civilians from nearby villages to make way for Princess Hwapyeong's tomb.

Princess Hwapyeong was buried in Munsan Village, Paju, Gyeonggi Province. Her elaborated funeral proceedings were comparable to that of a State Funeral.

Lady Hyegyeong claimed that during her first pregnancy she often dreamt of Princess Hwapyeong coming to her bedchamber, sitting next to her and sometimes smiling at her. When her first son was born, he bore the same birthmark as Princess Hwapyeong, and King Yeongjo took him as the reincarnation of the Princess.

Eulogies

Yearning for my elder sister, Princess Hwapyeong       

The flowers of the cherry trees are blooming in spring, brilliant leaves among scarlet petals. For how many times did my sister come to my rescue in my plight? Other though keen, yet helpless. I have only so few sisters born of the same mother. (We were like) wild geese having fun flying across the Sushui River together. Till the Mujin year (1748), I have been showered in your grace. And now, all of a sudden, you passed away. How sad! I do not know how my elder brother looked like. Who else could allay my sorrow? Morning drums thundered. I could not fall asleep. Sound of the pan (hitting the bells) in discord. Before they teach, Daoist priests  must first learn. Looking back to the days (we had at the) waterfront pavilion, I was in a daze throughout the night. I eschewed my own desolation to console my grieving mother. Riding on chariots, sorrows soared into the ninth Heaven. Feathery flags fluttering along the celestial path. Illness did not erode the filial piety in you. You would remind me to be diligent in my studies. Even in dreams, you would send regards to inquire about His Majesty’s health. Should I be happy or mourn? I must be looking haggard, for tears are streaming down my cheeks as if a river breached its banks. Who had no brothers? To whom could I pour out my heart to? In the northern garden, the moon shore on the pine forest. Underneath the eastern hill, wild birds shrieking. How could (a bird) fly with broken wings? It is such a pity that yellow birds did not have a hundred lives. The flock of wild geese is shrinking with just three of us left. Tree branches rustling, I sink into deep melancholy. Are dreams real or is reality a dream? Embraced by the cherry blossoms, I coalesced my thoughts to let bitterness fade with time. Times flies relentlessly, like the river that flows and never returns.       

Eulogy written for Park Myeong-won, Prince Consort Geumseong and Princess Hwapyeong    

My second aunt was virtuous and kind. My deceased grandfather loved her dearly. (He) married (her) into an illustrious family, gifted a fine residence (to the couple) and showered them with precious jade and gold jewelries. Husband and wife loved and respected each other like the harmonious resonance of the lute and psaltery. (My aunt's) character was as exemplary as that of the Queen of King Wen. The ladies-in-waiting praised her for her devotion to her brother. She helped him on various matters, going back and forth using all means to do whatever she could. When the female phoenix demises, the male phoenix retreats. But your legacy lives on. Returning to the Palace of Lu, I could still recall your sincere advice. You were diligent in your duties and courteous to your subordinates. If I visit your tomb and find it in a derelict state, I would not be able to sleep in peace and it would bother me for another ten years. Well-versed in Cheng-Chu classics, you never failed to be genuine in sharing your thoughts (to me). Whenever I look over to the mountains (where you are buried), I see a pearl in the dragon’s mouth. Capable man were summoned (to select the location) through divination. It would bring abundant peace and prosperity to our descendants for many years to come. You had been the pillar for our country and brought honor to your clan. Having an illustrious career, and accomplishing all “four beautiful elements”, you drew admiration from your colleagues. Now I am revisiting Paju with mixed feelings. How could the praises on your tomb stone sing enough of your achievements? Due to the strict code of conduct, I could only pass by your grave in a chariot. Thus, I have specially asked your nephew to pour you (on my behalf) yet another glass of wine.

Ancestry

Family 
 Great-grandfather
 King Hyeonjong of Joseon (조선 현종) (14 March 1641 - 17 September 1674)
 Great-grandmother 
 Queen Myeongseong of the Cheongpung Kim clan (명성왕후 김씨) (13 June 1642 - 21 January 1684)
 Grandfather
 King Sukjong of Joseon (7 October 1661 - 12 July 1720)
 Grandmother
 Royal Noble Consort Suk of the Haeju Choe clan (숙빈 최씨) (17 December 1670 - 9 April 1718)
 Father
 King Yeongjo of Joseon (조선 영조) (31 October 1694 - 22 April 1776)
 Mother
 Legal mother: Queen Jeongseong of the Daegu Seo clan (정성왕후 서씨) (12 January 1693 - 3 April 1757)
 Biological mother: Royal Noble Consort Yeong of the Jeonui Lee clan (영빈 이씨) (15 August 1696 - 23 August 1764)
 Grandfather: Lee Yu-beon (이유번, 李楡蕃)
 Grandmother: Lady Kim of the Hanyang Kim clan (정경부인 한양 김씨, 貞敬夫人 漢陽 金氏)
 Sibling(s)
 Unnamed younger sister (옹주) (8 March 1728 - 18 February 1731)
 Unnamed younger sister (옹주) (12 December 1729 - 21 March 1731)
 Unnamed younger sister (옹주) (1 January 1732 - 12 April 1736)
 Younger sister: Princess Hwahyeop (화협옹주) (1733 - 1752)
 Brother-in-law: Shin Gwang-su (신광수, 申光綏), Prince Consort Yeongseong (영성위) (1731 - 1775)
 Adoptive nephew: Shin Jae-seon (신재선, 申在善) (1753 - 1810)
 Younger brother: Crown Prince Sado (13 February 1735 - 12 July 1762)
 Sister-in-law: Lady Hyegyeong of the Pungsan Hong clan (혜경궁 홍씨) (6 August 1735 - 13 January 1816)
 Nephew: Crown Prince Uiso (의소세자) (27 September 1750 - 17 April 1752)
 Nephew: King Jeongjo of Joseon (조선 정조) (28 October 1752 - 18 August 1800)
 Niece: Princess Cheongyeon (청연공주) (1754 - 7 July 1821)
 Niece: Princess Cheongseon (청선공주) (1756 - 17 April 1802)
 Younger sister: Princess Hwawan (화완옹주) (9 March 1738 - May 1808)
 Brother-in-law: Jeong Chi-dal (정치달, 鄭致達), Prince Consort Ilseong (일성위, 日城尉) (14 December 1732 - 15 February 1757)
 Niece: Lady Jeong of the Yeonil Jeong clan (연일 정씨, 延日 鄭氏) (3 August 1756 - 23 January 1757)
 Adoptive nephew: Jeong Hu-gyeom (정후겸, 鄭厚謙) (1749 - 1776)
 Husband: Park Myeong-won, Prince Consort Geumseong (금성위 박명원, 錦城尉 朴明源) (1725 - 1770)
 Father-in-law: Park Sa-jeong (박사정, 朴師正) (1683 - 1739)
 Grandfather-in-law: Park Pil-ha (박필하, 朴弼夏) (1656 - 1719)
 Grandmother-in-law: Lady Yun of the Namwon Yun clan (남원 윤씨, 南原 尹氏) (? - 1719)
 Mother-in-law: Lady Yi of the Hampyeong Yi clan (함평 이씨, 咸平 李氏) (? - 1758)
 Grandfather-in-law: Yi Taek-sang (이택상, 李宅相)
 Grandmother-in-law: Lady Park of the Hamyang Park clan (함양 박씨, 咸陽 朴氏)
 Issue
 Adoptive son: Park Sang-cheol (박상철, 朴相喆) (1737 - 1761)
 Adoptive daughter-in-law: Lady Kim of the Andong Kim clan (안동 김씨, 安東 金氏)

References

See also
History of Korea
Joseon Dynasty

1727 births
1748 deaths
History of Korea
18th-century Korean people
Princesses of Joseon
Deaths_in_childbirth